The Cascata dos Anjos (Angels Waterfall) is a waterfall located in the civil parish of Anjos, municipality of Ponta do Sol, on the Portuguese island of Madeira.

The waterfall cascades over the rockface onto the old E.R.101 regional roadway, and spills into the sea below.

See also
 List of waterfalls

References

Waterfalls of Madeira
Geography of Madeira